The Black Hawk Powwow Grounds are located in Komensky, Wisconsin. In 2007, the site was added to the National Register of Historic Places.

History
The grounds have been used by the Ho-Chunk for ceremonial and other purposes since the 1800s. Adjacent to grounds is a marker honoring Mitchell Red Cloud, Jr. Red Cloud, who was born in the place of Hatfield, Wisconsin located within Komensky, was the grandson of a Ho-Chunk chief and received the Medal of Honor for his actions during the Korean War.

References

Event venues on the National Register of Historic Places in Wisconsin
Geography of Jackson County, Wisconsin
Native American history of Wisconsin
National Register of Historic Places in Jackson County, Wisconsin
Properties of religious function on the National Register of Historic Places in Wisconsin